Wayne Philip Colin Sleep  (born 17 July 1948) is a British dancer, director, choreographer, and actor who appeared on the BBC series The Real Marigold on Tour and ITV's The Real Full Monty.

Early life
Sleep was born in Plymouth, Devon. His mother enrolled him at an early age with Geraldine Lamb Dance School, where he studied tap and jazz, wanting to be the next Gene Kelly or Fred Astaire rather than a ballet dancer. He and his family moved to Hartlepool ca. 1951 and spent 10 years there. He lived at Friar Terrace on the Headland and attended Baltic Street Junior School. He began ballet lessons in Hartlepool in 1955 with Muriel Carr, before gaining a Leverhulme Scholarship to the Royal Ballet School in 1961 and joining the Royal Ballet in 1966 and becoming a senior principal dancer performing globally.

Career
At 157cm (5'2"), he is the shortest male dancer admitted into the Royal Ballet School. Because of his diminutive stature, many directors were reluctant to cast him in traditional male lead roles. As a result, many roles were created for him by noted choreographers, including Ashton, MacMillan, de Valois, Layton, Nureyev, Gillian Lynne and Neumeier. Sleep is often chosen for character roles because of his unusual physique. In 1982, Andrew Lloyd Webber adapted his Variations album as the second half of stage show Song and Dance for Sleep. Sleep created the role of Mr Mistoffelees in Lloyd Webber's musical Cats in London's West End at the New London Theatre on 11 May 1981.

In 1973, he established a world record by doing an entrechat-douze, a jump with 12 beats of the feet, on the British television  programme Record Breakers. This record still stands. Sleep later jumped from an aircraft for charity, after being challenged by presenter Roy Castle who said: "I’m going to beat your record and you've got to beat mine for tap dancing (the most taps in one minute) – but on my terms".

Television
As an actor, Sleep's credits include Tigger in Winnie the Pooh and Villiers in The Virgin Soldiers. He also appeared as himself in The Goodies episode "Football Crazy". Sleep's choreography credits include David and Goliath.

He was the subject of This Is Your Life in 1981 when he was surprised by Eamonn Andrews following a performance of the musical Cats at the New London Theatre.

Sleep is remembered for having danced with Diana, Princess of Wales at the annual Christmas party of the Friends of Covent Garden at the Royal Opera House in 1985.

In 2003, Sleep appeared in the reality-TV series I'm a Celebrity... Get Me Out of Here!. In the 2005/06 pantomime season, he appeared in Beauty and the Beast at the Theatre Royal, Windsor. Sleep  completed a tour of Magic of the Musicals with Marti Webb and Robert Meadmore, as well as appearing as a judge on BBC One's Strictly Dance Fever.

Sleep has worked with the British Shakespeare Company on three occasions, playing Puck in A Midsummer Night's Dream twice (national tour in 2006) as well as Feste in Twelfth Night.

Sleep runs workshops that children of over the age of six can attend. He has  appeared as Uncle Willy in a performance of High Society and  appeared as the Emcee in Cabaret.

Sleep also appeared in the 2008 series of Ant and Dec's Saturday Night Takeaway as a team member in the feature Ant v. Dec. On the first show, Ant's team lost the challenge which meant Ant had to choose one of the team members to be eliminated and chose Sleep.

In January 2011, Sleep featured on British reality cooking show Come Dine with Me, with presenter Terry Christian, Labour MP Diane Abbott and model Danielle Lloyd.

In August 2013, Sleep joined ITV's dance show, Stepping Out as a judge with Melanie Brown and Jason Gardiner. The show aired for one series.

On 5 January 2014, Sleep and his family went on the game show All Star Family Fortunes, playing against Girls Aloud member Kimberley Walsh.

In February 2014, Sleep appeared in the Channel 4 show Big Ballet about overweight ballet dancers. He finished fourth in the 2014 series of the BBC One cookery contest Celebrity MasterChef.

In 2015, he appeared in a celebrity edition of The Chase, a game show where he competed for charity.

Sleep also appeared in the BBC miniseries that followed a group of celebrity pensioners on a journey to India, The Real Marigold Hotel, broadcast from January to February in 2016. He appeared in subsequent episodes travelling to Florida and Japan in December 2016 and then China and Cuba in December 2017.

In 2017 he appeared in The Real Full Monty, celebrating the original movie's 20th anniversary and raising awareness for prostate and testicular cancer. He also appeared in the BBC's Queer As Art documentary celebrating the LGBTQ contribution to British arts in the 50 years since decriminalisation.

In January 2018 Sleep entered the British version of Celebrity Big Brother, making the final and finishing in fifth place.

Cinema
Sleep performed as an actor in The Virgin Soldiers (1969), The First Great Train Robbery (1979) and Elizabeth (1998). 

He performed as a dancer in Tales of Beatrix Potter (1971) as Squirrel Nutkin and Tom Thumb.

He directed the choreography of the tango scene in the 1978 film Death on the Nile.

Theatre 
Sleep took the role of Puck in one of the early productions of Britten's Shakespeare opera A Midsummer Night's Dream.

In 2009 Sleep appeared as the MC in Life is a Cabaret by the Birmingham Repertory Theatre, which presented excerpts from Cabaret, alongside Siobhan Dillon as Sally Bowles.

He appeared in 2019 in Cinderella at Cambridge Art's Theatre, Cambridgeshire

He appeared in 2016 in Jack and The Beanstalk at Theatre Royal, Norwich

Popular culture
Sleep is a subject in David Hockney's painting George Lawson and Wayne Sleep (1972-75), which is exhibited at the Tate in London.

Sleep is mentioned in "Never Say Alan Again", an episode from the second series of I'm Alan Partridge. When Michael's Americanophile friend Tex mentions that "[my idol] has gotta be Wayne", Alan mistakenly concludes he means Sleep. Tex tries to correct this misconception by drawling "Get on yer horse and drink yer milk" in an approximation of John Wayne's voice, but Alan is merely further confirmed in his belief that Sleep is the man to whom Tex is referring.

Sleep is mentioned numerous times in the film Billy Elliot and in the British stage musical version of this film. (On Broadway, references to Sleep were changed to Rudolf Nureyev.)

The diminutive and frizz-haired Green Wing character Martin Dear (played by Karl Theobald) refers to Sleep as the celebrity to whom he was most flattered to have his appearance compared.

In Sean Lock's 15 Storeys High, Sleep is one of several people to whom Vince addresses a letter.

In 2017, Sleep performed at Dame Vera Lynn's 100th birthday celebrations at the London Palladium.

In 2020, Sleep was portrayed by dancer Jay Webb on the TV series The Crown, during its reenactment of Sleep's performance with Diana, Princess of Wales, at the Royal Opera House.

Radio
In 2016, Sleep was the first artist to appear on BBC Radio 2's Friday Night Is Music Night, recorded live at the Watford Colosseum on Monday 10 October with BBC Concert Orchestra.

In 2017, he appeared on Clare Teal's BBC Radio 2 show.

On 26 February 2023, he was the subject of a broadcast in the Private Passions series on BBC Radio 3, discussing his personal and professional life interspersed with relevant musical recordings.

Publications
He published Variations on Wayne Sleep and his autobiography Precious Little Sleep.

Personal life

Sleep lives with his spouse José Bergera in West London.

Sleep received honorary degrees from the Universities of Exeter, Teesside and Plymouth and is a recipient of the Carl Alan Award, an industry honour voted for by dance professionals in recognition of outstanding contributions to dance.

Sleep was friendly with theatre critic Jack Tinker; the two men were often mistaken for each other. At the premiere of a production of The Comedy of Errors, a play which depends on sets of identical twins being confused for one another, Tinker brought an identically dressed Sleep as his companion. At Tinker's memorial celebration, a pastiche of Stephen Sondheim's musical Sweeney Todd was staged entitled Tinker Jack, the Demon Critic of Fleet Street in which Sleep played Tinker, serially executing several major West End producers (who played themselves) for inflicting particular dramatic atrocities upon the city's theatre goers.

His charity, the Wayne Sleep Foundation, helps students who have successfully gained a place at a performing arts vocational college. He continues to pass his knowledge through private tuition and workshops for all ages.

Sleep is a patron of the British Ballet Organisation and vice president of the Royal Academy of Dance. He is vice president of the Vic-Wells Association.

Sleep is an ambassador for Prostate Cancer UK and the Royal Voluntary Service as well as supporting the Terence Higgins Trust and other charities.

References

External links
 
 

1948 births
Living people
People from Hartlepool
Male actors from Plymouth, Devon
Actors from County Durham
LGBT dancers
Principal dancers of The Royal Ballet
British male ballet dancers
People educated at the Royal Ballet School
English gay actors
Officers of the Order of the British Empire
I'm a Celebrity...Get Me Out of Here! (British TV series) participants